69 Ceti is a single star located around 860 light years away in the equatorial constellation of Cetus. It is visible to the naked eye with an apparent visual magnitude of 5.3. This is an aging red giant star with a stellar classification of M1/2III. It is radiating 1,813 times the Sun's luminosity from an enlarged photosphere, 100 times the Sun's radius, at an effective temperature of 3,765 K.

References

M-type giants
Cetus (constellation)
Durchmusterung objects
Ceti, 69
014652
011201
0689